General Sir Patrick "Peter" Edmonstone Craigie,  (3 February 1794 – 13 December 1873) was a senior officer in the British Army.

Life

He was born the third son of Lawrence Craigie, later twice Lord Provost of Glasgow. He was educated at Glasgow School and College and in 1813 joined the 52nd (Oxfordshire) Regiment of Foot (Light Infantry) as an ensign.

He served with the 2nd Battalion in Holland during the Napoleonic Wars in the campaign of 1813–14. He took part in the attacks on the fortified village of Merxem on the outskirts of Antwerp, where he led the advance party of Major-General Sir Herbert Taylor's Brigade, and in the bombardment of Antwerp itself.

He became Lieutenant by purchase in 1814, Captain by purchase in 1821 and Major by purchase in 1826. In 1834 he transferred as a Lieutenant-Colonel to take command of the 55th Foot. In 1841 he was posted to China under Lord Gough and commanded the 55th Foot during the First Opium War. There he led a brigade at the capture of Amoy, Chusan and Chinhai. He was subsequently made governor of the Island of Chusan for eight months until the peace treaty had been signed. In reward for his services, he was promoted Colonel in 1842, made Aide-de-Camp to Queen Victoria and a Companion of the Order of the Bath (CB).

From 1855 to 1860 he commanded the Centre Division of the Madras Army and was promoted Major-General in 1854 and Lieutenant-General in 1860. During the Indian Mutiny of 1857 he was in command of the Mysore division at Bangalore until the fall of Delhi.

He was made Colonel of the 31st (Huntingdonshire) Regiment of Foot in 1859, transferring to be Colonel of the 55th Foot from 1862 until his death in 1873. In 1867 he was created KCB and made up to full General on 21 January 1868.

He died at his home in St Leonards-on-Sea, Sussex. He had married twice; firstly Belle, the daughter of Henry Williams and secondly Mary Jane, the daughter of Lt-General Trewman. He had 1 son and 5 daughters.

References

1794 births
1873 deaths
Military personnel from Glasgow
British Army generals
55th Regiment of Foot officers
Knights Commander of the Order of the Bath
British Army personnel of the Napoleonic Wars
52nd Regiment of Foot officers
British military personnel of the First Opium War
British military personnel of the Indian Rebellion of 1857
East Surrey Regiment officers